Taiyō no Uta may refer to:

"Taiyō no Uta" (song), 2006 Erika Sawajiri song
Taiyō no Uta (TV series), 2006 TBS TV series
Taiyō no Uta (film), 2006 film